Daphne's Oldfield mouse (Thomasomys daphne) is a species of rodent in the family Cricetidae.
It is found in Bolivia and Peru.

References

 Baillie, J. 1996.  Thomasomys daphne.   2006 IUCN Red List of Threatened Species.   Downloaded on 20 July 2007.
Musser, G. G. and M. D. Carleton. 2005. Superfamily Muroidea. pp. 894–1531 in Mammal Species of the World a Taxonomic and Geographic Reference. D. E. Wilson and D. M. Reeder eds. Johns Hopkins University Press, Baltimore.

Thomasomys
Mammals described in 1917
Taxa named by Oldfield Thomas
Taxonomy articles created by Polbot